1. Göppinger SV is a German association football club from the city of Göppingen, Baden-Württemberg. 



History
The team was established on 13 October 1905 as 1. Göppingener Fußballverein and lays claim to being the oldest football club in the city. On 24 April 1920, soon after World War I the club merged with Athletiksportverein 1895 Göppingen and took on its current identity. The origins of predecessor side ASV go back to 11 August 1895 formation of 1. Athletik Klub Göppingen. This club merged with Kraftsportverein Fortuna Göppingen in 1901 to become Athleten-Klub Foruna Göppingen. They adopted the name Athletiksportverein Göppingen early in 1907, and in 1911 merged with Sportclub Göppingen.

SV first came to notice in 1934 when they became part of the Gauliga Württemberg, one of 16 top-flight divisions created in the reorganization of German football under the Third Reich a year earlier. The club only spent the 1934–35 and 1936–37 seasons in first division play, being sent down on both occasions after 10th-place finishes. They returned to the Gauliga in 1943, captured the division title, and then went out in the opening round of the national playoffs to KSG Saarbrücken (3–5). The following season was that last before World War II interrupted play across the country.

After the war, Göppingen took up play in the Landesliga Württemberg (II), but was sent down in 1948 after just three seasons. It was not until 1968 that they returned to third tier competition in the Amateurliga Nordwürttemberg. They finished second and the next year took the division title, which led to their participation in the national amateur championship playoffs. SV moved on to the semifinals where they were eliminated 1–0, 2–1 by SC Jülich 1910.

In league play, a successful promotion playoff advanced SV to the Regionalliga Süd (II) where they found themselves overmatched. They returned to the Amateurliga Nordwürttemberg (III) which later (1980) became the Amateuroberliga Baden-Württemberg (III). They enjoyed a string of strong finishes through the late 70s before slipping away to lower tier local play in the mid-80s. It was during this period that they made appearances in the opening rounds of the German Cup tournament (1975, 1980, 1984). SV played first in the Oberliga Baden-Württemberg (III) until 1985, then in the Verbandsliga Württemberg (IV) until 1991 and then descended through the Landesliga Württemberg (V) to the Bezirksliga (VI) in 1994. Since 2007, SV have played in the Landesliga Württemberg (VI), from where they earned promotion back to the Verbandsliga in 2009. In 2013–14 and 2014–15 the club finished runners-up in the league and thereby earned the right to compete in the promotion round to the Oberliga. In 2014 it missed out to FC Germania Friedrichstal and, in 2015, to 1. CfR Pforzheim, thereby remaining in the Verbandsliga. Finishing runners-up in the league for a third consecutive time in 2015–16 the club took part in the promotion round once more, this time defeating TSG Weinheim on aggregate and moving up to the Oberliga, ending a 31-year absence for the club.

Honours
 Gauliga Württemberg (I)
 Champions: 1944
 Amateurliga Nordwürttemberg (III)
 Champions: 1970
 Verbandsliga Württemberg
 Runners-up: 2014, 2015, 2016

Recent seasons
The recent season-by-season performance of the club:

 With the introduction of the Regionalligas in 1994 and the 3. Liga in 2008 as the new third tier, below the 2. Bundesliga, all leagues below dropped one tier.

References

External links 
Official team site
Das deutsche Fußball-Archiv historical German domestic league tables 

Football clubs in Germany
Football clubs in Baden-Württemberg
Association football clubs established in 1895
1895 establishments in Germany